Miccolamia laosensis is a species of beetle in the family Cerambycidae. It was described by Breuning in 1962. It is known from Laos.

References

Desmiphorini
Beetles described in 1962